Levon Pogosian is a cosmologist and a Professor of Physics at Simon Fraser University.

Pogosian works on a range topics that include cosmic microwave background, large scale structure, dark energy and modified gravity, observational probes of physics beyond Standard Model, cosmic (super)strings and other topological defects, and cosmological magnetic fields.

He has an h-index of 44 according to Google Scholar.

References

External links
  Levon Pogosian's articles on arXiv
 Levon Pogosian's articles on NASA ADS
 Levon Pogosian's articles on INSPIRE HEP

Year of birth missing (living people)
Living people
West Virginia University alumni
Case Western Reserve University alumni
Academic staff of Simon Fraser University
Canadian physicists
21st-century Canadian astronomers